Tsing may refer to:

Jing (disambiguation)
Jin (disambiguation)
Qing (disambiguation)
Qin (disambiguation)
Ching (disambiguation)
Chin (disambiguation)
Tsin (disambiguation)